Carica is a genus of flowering plants in the family Caricaceae including the papaya (C. papaya syn. C. peltata, C. posoposa), a widely cultivated fruit tree native to the American tropics.

The genus was formerly treated as including about 20-25 species of short-lived evergreen pachycaul shrubs or small trees growing to 5–10 m tall, native to tropical Central and South America, but recent genetic evidence has resulted in all of these species other than C. papaya being reclassified into three other genera.

Taxonomy 
The genus name comes from the botanical name of the fig, Ficus carica, because of the species' leaves or fruits resemble that of it. The carica epithet comes from Caria in southwest Anatolia (Asia Minor), Turkey, where the fig was mistakenly thought to have come from.

Species
According to World Flora Online, the genus Carica lists 21 species. Most of the other species have since been transferred to the genus Vasconcellea, with a few to the genera Jacaratia and Jarilla. According to the Catalogue of Life, the four remaining species in the genus are:

Carica aprica V. M. Badillo
Carica augusti Harms
Carica cnidoscoloides Lorence & R. Torres
Carica papaya L. (Papaya)

The species that have since been transferred to their new genera are as follows:
Carica baccata = Vasconcellea microcarpa subsp. baccata
Carica candamarcensis = Vasconcellea cundinamarcensis (Mountain papaya)
Carica candicans = Vasconcellea candicans (Mito)
Carica caudata = Jarilla heterophylla
Carica cauliflora = Vasconcellea cauliflora
Carica cestriflora = Vasconcellea cundinamarcensis
Carica chilensis = Vasconcellea chilensis
Carica crassipetala = Vasconcellea crassipetala
Carica cundinamarcensis = Vasconcellea cundinamarcensis
Carica dodecaphylla = Jacaratia spinosa
Carica glandulosa = Vasconcellea glandulosa
Carica goudotiana = Vasconcellea goudotiana
Carica heterophylla = Vasconcellea microcarpa subsp. heterophylla
Carica horovitziana = Vasconcellea horovitziana
Carica longiflora = Vasconcellea longiflora
Carica mexicana = Jacaratia mexicana
Carica microcarpa = Vasconcellea microcarpa
Carica monoica = Vasconcellea monoica
Carica nana = Jarilla nana
Carica omnilingua = Vasconcellea omnilingua
Carica palandensis = Vasconcellea palandensis
Carica parviflora = Vasconcellea parviflora
Carica pentagona = Vasconcellea × heilbornii (Babaco)
Carica pubescens = Vasconcellea pubescens (Mountain papaya or Chilean Carica)
Carica pulchra = Vasconcellea pulchra
Carica quercifolia = Vasconcellea quercifolia
Carica sphaerocarpa = Vasconcellea sphaerocarpa
Carica spinosa = Jacaratia spinosa
Carica sprucei = Vasconcellea sprucei
Carica stipulata = Vasconcellea stipulata
Carica weberbaueri = Vasconcellea weberbaueri

Notes

References
Germplasm Resources Information Network: Carica
Germplasm Resources Information Network: Carica species list and synonymy
Aradhya, M. K. et al. (1999). A phylogenetic analysis of the genus Carica L. (Caricaceae) based on restriction fragment length variation in a cpDNA intergenic spacer region. Genet. Resources Crop Evol. 46: 579–586.
Badillo, V. M. (2000). Carica L. vs. Vasconcella St. Hil. (Caricaceae) con la rehabilitacion de este ultimo. Ernstia 10: 74–79.
Van Droogenbroeck, B. et al. (2002). AFLP analysis of genetic relationships among papaya and its wild relatives (Caricaceae) from Ecuador. Theoret. Appl. Genet. 105: 289–297.

External links

IUCN Red List entry

Caricaceae
Brassicales genera